The 19th Filmfare Awards were held in 1972, honoring the best in Hindi films in the year 1971. 

Anand and Mera Naam Joker led the ceremony with 7 nominations, followed by Kati Patang with 6 nominations.

Anand won 6 awards, including Best Film, Best Actor (for Rajesh Khanna) and Best Supporting Actor (for Amitabh Bachchan), thus becoming the most-awarded film at the ceremony.

Rajesh Khanna received dual nominations for Best Actor for his performances in Anand and Kati Patang, winning for the former.

Jaya Bachchan received dual nominations for Best Actress for her performances in Guddi and Uphaar, but lost to Asha Parekh who won the award for Kati Patang, her first and only win in the category.

Main Awards

Best Film
 Anand 
Mera Naam Joker 
Naya Zamana

Best Director
 Raj Kapoor – Mera Naam Joker 
Hrishikesh Mukherjee – Anand
Shakti Samanta – Kati Patang

Best Actor
 Rajesh Khanna – Anand 
Dharmendra – Mera Gaon Mera Desh
Rajesh Khanna – Kati Patang

Best Actress
 Asha Parekh – Kati Patang 
Jaya Bachchan – Guddi
Jaya Bachchan – Uphaar

Best Supporting Actor
 Amitabh Bachchan – Anand 
Pran – Adhikar
Shatrughan Sinha – Paras

Best Supporting Actress
 Farida Jalal – Paras 
Aruna Irani – Caravan
Helen – Elaan

Best Comic Actor
 Mehmood – Paras 
Jagdeep – Ek Nari Ek Brahmachari
Mehmood – Main Sunder Hoon

Best Story
 Anand – Hrishikesh Mukherjee 
Kati Patang – Gulshan Nanda
Naya Zamana – Gulshan Nanda

Best Screenplay
 Sara Aakash – Basu Chatterjee

Best Dialogue
 Anand – Gulzar

Best Music Director 
 Mera Naam Joker – Shankar-Jaikishan 
Andaz – Shankar-Jaikishan
Caravan – R.D. Burman

Best Lyricist
 Andaz – Hasrat Jaipuri for Zindagi Ek Safar Hai Suhana 
Kati Patang – Anand Bakshi for Na Koi Umang Hai
Mera Naam Joker – Gopaldas Neeraj for Ey Bhai Zara Dekh Ke Chalo

Best Playback Singer, Male
 Mera Naam Joker – Manna Dey for Ey Bhai Zara Dekh Ke Chalo 
Andaz – Kishore Kumar for Zindagi Ek Safar
Kati Patang – Kishore Kumar for Yeh Jo Mohabbat Hai

Best Playback Singer, Female
 Caravan – Asha Bhosle for Piya Tu Ab to Aa Ja 
Andaz – Asha Bhosle for Zindagi Ek Safar
Ek Nari Ek Brahmachari – Sharda for Aap Ke Peeche

Best Art Direction
 Seema

Best B&W Cinematography
 Dastak

Best Color Cinematography
 Mera Naam Joker

Best Editing
 Anand

Best Sound
 Mera Naam Joker

Special Award 
 Jaya Bachchan for Uphaar
 Prithviraj Kapoor – Special Commendation

Critics' Awards

Best Film
 Ashadh Ka Ek Din

Best Documentary
 Creations in Metal

Biggest winners
 Anand – 6/7
 Mera Naam Joker – 5/7
 Paras – 2/3

See also
 21st Filmfare Awards
 20th Filmfare Awards

References

External links 
https://www.imdb.com/event/ev0000245/1972/

Filmfare Awards
Filmfare
1972 in Indian cinema